Björklund or Bjørklund or Bjorklund is a surname of Swedish and Norwegian origin and may refer to:

Björklund
Anders Björklund (born 1945), Swedish neuroscientist
Elina Björklund (born 1970), Finnish business executive
Eva Björklund (born 1942), Swedish Left Party politician
Gustafva Björklund (1794–1862), Swedish cook book author
Heléne Björklund (born 1972), Swedish social democratic politician
Henrik Björklund (born 1990), Swedish ice hockey player
Irina Björklund (born 1973), Finnish actress
Jan Björklund (born 1962), Swedish politician
Joachim Björklund (born 1971), Swedish professional footballer
Kristoffer Björklund (born 1978), Swedish football player
Leni Björklund (born 1944), Swedish Social Democratic politician
Mirjam Björklund (born 1998), Swedish tennis player
Rolf Björklund Finnish sprint canoer
Timothy Björklund, American director of animated film and television

Bjørklund
Kjetil Bjørklund (born 1967), Norwegian politician
Terje Bjørklund, Norwegian composer and jazz musician
Thor Bjørklund, Norwegian inventor

Bjorklund
Angie Bjorklund (born 1989), American basketball player 
Arnold L. Bjorklund  (1918–1979) United States Army soldier during World War II 
Blake Bjorklund (born 1985), American stock car racer
Bob Bjorklund (1918–1994), American football player
David F. Bjorklund, American professor of psychology
Gary C. Bjorklund,  American physicist and president of the Optical Society of America 
Garry Bjorklund (born 1951), American track athlete 
Steve Bjorklund, American musician

Swedish-language surnames
Norwegian-language surnames